This is a list of tertiary institutions in Mauritius.

Universities

Other institutions

See also

 Tertiary education in Mauritius
 Education in Mauritius
 List of universities and colleges by country

References

External links
 Tertiary Education Commission
 Ministry of Tertiary Education, Science, Research and Technology

Education in Mauritius
Universities
Mauritius
 
Mauritius